Encaustic may refer to:

Encaustic painting, using a wax medium, or a different technique in English pottery
Encaustic tile, with inlaid clay to form polychrome patterns